George Gordon Byron Yeckley (February 13, 1831March 18, 1875) was a Michigan politician.

Early life and education
George was born on February 13, 1831, in Gorham, New York, to parents Adam and Gertrude Yeckley. George received a public school education. In 1853, George moved to Ypsilanti, Michigan. In 1860, George moved to Hamilton in Van Buren County, Michigan.

Career
Yeckley was a farmer, who had maintained and improved a farm in Michigan. Yeckley served as supervisor of Hamilton from 1867 to 1873. On November 3, 1874, Yeckley was elected to the Michigan House of Representatives, where he represented the Van Buren County 2nd district from January 6, 1875, until his death.

Personal life
Yeckley married Eliza Reed. Together they had six children.

Death
Yeckley died on March 18, 1875. He was interred at Hamilton Cemetery in Decatur, Michigan.

References

1831 births
1875 deaths
Burials in Michigan
Farmers from Michigan
Republican Party members of the Michigan House of Representatives
People from Gorham, New York
People from Van Buren County, Michigan
Politicians from Ypsilanti, Michigan
20th-century American politicians